Adrian Stephen Breton (4 October 1962 – 11 June 2007) was a British sports shooter from Guernsey. He competed at the 1988 and 1992 Summer Olympics. He also competed in the Commonwealth Games, winning a gold, silver and bronze medal.

References

External links 
 
 

1962 births
2007 deaths
British male sport shooters
Olympic shooters of Great Britain
Shooters at the 1988 Summer Olympics
Shooters at the 1992 Summer Olympics
Shooters at the 1982 Commonwealth Games
Shooters at the 1986 Commonwealth Games
Shooters at the 1990 Commonwealth Games
Shooters at the 1994 Commonwealth Games
Shooters at the 1998 Commonwealth Games
Commonwealth Games medallists in shooting
Commonwealth Games gold medallists for Guernsey
Commonwealth Games silver medallists for Guernsey
Commonwealth Games bronze medallists for Guernsey
20th-century British people
Medallists at the 1986 Commonwealth Games
Medallists at the 1990 Commonwealth Games
Medallists at the 1994 Commonwealth Games